The 97th Brigade was a formation of  the British Army during the First World War. It was raised as part of the new army also known as Kitchener's Army and assigned to the 32nd Division. The brigade served on the Western Front.

Cyril Blacklock commanded the brigade in 1917.

Formation
The infantry battalions did not all serve at once, but all were assigned to the brigade during the war. (All cited to footnote)

 11th Battalion, Border Regiment (Lonsdale)
 15th Battalion, Highland Light Infantry (1st Glasgow)
 16th Battalion, Highland Light Infantry (2nd Glasgow)
 17th Battalion, Highland Light Infantry (3rd Glasgow)
 2nd Battalion, King's Own Yorkshire Light Infantry
 10th Battalion, Argyll & Sutherland Highlanders
 1/5th Battalion, Border Regiment
 97th Machine Gun Company
 97th Trench Mortar Battery

References

Infantry brigades of the British Army in World War I
Pals Brigades of the British Army